"Used to This" is a song by American rapper Future. It was released on November 4, 2016, by Freebandz and Epic Records, as the intended lead single from his then-unreleased mixtape Beast Mode 2 (2018), however, it was later included on the streaming version of Future (2017). The hip hop song, produced by Zaytoven, features a guest appearance from frequent collaborator Drake.

Music video
The music video for "Used to This" was released via Future's Vevo account on November 4, 2016. In the video, they wear Mexican soccer jerseys and hold the Mexican flag to represent Mexico women's national football team.

Charts

Weekly charts

Year-end charts

Certifications

References

External links

 

2016 singles
2016 songs
Future (rapper) songs
Drake (musician) songs
Epic Records singles
Songs written by Future (rapper)
Songs written by Drake (musician)
Songs written by Zaytoven
Song recordings produced by Zaytoven